Admiral of the Fleet is a five-star naval officer rank and the highest rank of the Royal Navy formally established in 1688. The five-star NATO rank code is OF-10, equivalent to a field marshal in the British Army or a Marshal of the Royal Air Force.  Other than honorary appointments, no new admirals of the fleet have been named since 1995, and no honorary appointments have been made since 2014.

History

The origins of the rank can be traced back to John de Beauchamp, 1st Baron Beauchamp de Warwick, who was appointed 'Admiral of the King's Southern, Northern and Western Fleets' on 18 July 1360. The appointment gave the command of the English navy to one person for the first time; this evolved into the post of Admiral of the Fleet. In the days of sailing ships the admiral distinctions then used by the Royal Navy included distinctions related to the fleet being divided into three divisions – red, white, or blue. Each division was assigned at least one admiral, who in turn commanded a number of vice-admirals and rear admirals. While the full admirals were nominally equals, tradition gave precedence to the Admiral of the White who held the fleet rank in addition to his substantive role.

Eighteenth and nineteenth centuries
The Restoration era brought a general reorganisation of naval ranks and structure, including formalisation of the admiral of the fleet role. In a break with tradition the rank was awarded to the most senior Admiral of the Red, who retained this substantive rank while also serving as Admiral of the Fleet. Appointments were for life, remunerated via a £5 daily stipend and an annual allowance of £1,014 for the hiring and maintenance of servants. It was intended that only one officer would hold the rank at any time, with their presence aboard any naval vessel to be denoted by the flying of the Royal Standard from the main mast.

The ranks of Admiral of the Fleet and Admiral of the Red were formally separated from 1805, with an announcement in the London Gazette that "His Majesty [has] been pleased to order the Rank of Admirals of the Red to be restored" in His Majesty's Navy..." as a separate role. The same Gazette promoted 22 men to that rank. From the nineteenth century onward there were also occasional variations to the previous requirement that only one Admiral of Fleet could serve at one time. In 1821 George IV appointed Sir John Jervis as a second admiral of the fleet, to balance the Duke of Wellingtons promotion as a second Field Marshal in the British Army. In 1830 King William IV increased the number of admirals of the fleet to three, though these additional lifetime postings subsequently lapsed. Between 1854 and 1857 there was no admiral of the fleet at all as the most senior naval officer of the time  Admiral of the Red Thomas Le Marchant Gosselin  was mentally ill and had not served at sea for forty-five years. In deference to Gosselin's seniority the position was instead left vacant until his death in 1857, whereupon it was filled by Admiral Charles Ogle.

In practice the rank had lost its formal authority from 1828, when the professional head of the Royal Navy was given the title of First Naval Lord (renamed First Sea Lord in 1904). Thereafter it was periodically granted to retiring First Naval Lords as an honorary promotion, only passing to the most senior Admiral if there was no other candidate. On occasion even this seniority principle was abandoned, as on the death of Provo Wallis in 1892 when the promotion went to John Edmund Commerell rather than the senior Algernon Frederick Rous de Horsey.

Twentieth century
The organisation of the British fleet into coloured squadrons was abandoned in 1864, though the rank of admiral of the fleet was maintained. During the two World Wars a number of serving officers held active commissions as admirals of the fleet, as well as the First Sea Lord. e.g. Sir John Tovey.

Prince Philip, Duke of Edinburgh was created an Admiral of the Fleet in the Royal New Zealand Navy in 1954, following the coronation of his wife Elizabeth II as Queen. This promotion was to a New Zealand rank, separate from the Royal Navy rank.

Following the creation of the Chief of the Defence Staff in 1959, the five naval officers appointed to that position became admirals of the fleet. Recognizing the reduced post–Cold War size of the British Armed Forces, no further appointments were made to the rank after 1995 when Sir Benjamin Bathurst was appointed admiral of the fleet on his retirement as First Sea Lord. The rank was not abolished and in 2012 the Prince of Wales (now King Charles III) became an honorary admiral of the fleet (as well as field marshal and marshal of the Royal Air Force), in recognition of his support to Queen Elizabeth II in her role of as Commander-in-Chief of the British Armed Forces. In 2014, Lord Boyce, a former First Sea Lord and Chief of the Defence Staff, was also appointed an honorary admiral of the fleet.

Admirals of the Fleet

See also

 Admiral of the fleet as used in other countries
 British ensigns
 British and U.S. military ranks compared
 Coloured squadrons of the Royal Navy
 Comparative military ranks
 First Sea Lord
 Lord High Admiral of the United Kingdom
 Royal Navy officer rank insignia

References

Sources

External links 
 

Admirals
F
Lists of admirals
Military ranks of the Royal Navy

Five-star officers